Matthew C. Nicholls (born 1978) is visiting professor of classics at the University of Reading and senior tutor at St John's College, University of Oxford. He is a specialist in libraries in the Roman empire and the history of the city of Rome. He has also created a large scale digital reconstruction of the ancient city of Rome, which is the basis of a popular Massive Open Online Course or MOOC.

Selected publications
 "Bibliotheca Latina Graecaque: on the possible division of Roman libraries by language". Latomus: SIEN Neronia VIII (2011), 327 . pp. 11–21. ISSN 0023-8856
 "Galen and libraries in the Peri Alupias", Journal of Roman Studies, Vol. 101 (2011), pp. 123–142. ISSN 1753-528X doi: https://doi.org/10.1017/S0075435811000049
 "Public libraries in the cities of the Roman Empire" in G. Woolf et al. (eds.) (2013) Ancient Libraries. Cambridge University Press. 
 "Libraries and literature in Rome" in A. Claridge & C. Holleran (eds.) (2013) Companion to the City of Rome. Wiley-Blackwell. 
 "A library at Antium?" in C. K. Rothschild & T. W. Thompson (eds.) (2014) Galen's De Indolentia: essays on a newly discovered letter. Studien und Texte zu Antike und Christentum (88). Mohr Siebeck, Tübingen, pp. 65–78. 
 "Le biblioteche come centri di cultura nel mondo Romano" in R. Meneghini & R. Rossella (eds.) (2014) La biblioteca Infinita: i luoghi di sapere nel mondo antico. Electa, Milan, pp. 82–97. 
 "Libraries and networks of influence in the Roman world", Segno e Testo, 13 (2015), pp. 125–146. ISSN 2037-0245
 "Libraries and communication in the Ancient World" in F. S. Naiden & R. J. A. Talbert (eds.) (2017) Mercury's Wings: exploring modes of communication in the ancient world. Oxford University Press, New York. 
 "Sketchup and digital modelling for Classics" in B. Natoli & S. Hunt (eds.) (2019) Teaching Classics with Technology. Bloomsbury, London, pp. 131–144. 
 "'Bookish places' in Imperial Rome: bookshops and the urban landscape of learning" in S. A. Adams (ed.) (2019) Scholastic Culture in the Hellenistic and Roman Eras: Greek, Latin, and Jewish. De Gruyter, pp. 51–68.

References

External links 
https://www.futurelearn.com/courses/rome

Living people
Academics of the University of Reading
1978 births
Historians of libraries
Historians of ancient Rome
Alumni of St John's College, Oxford
Fellows of St John's College, Oxford
British classical scholars